International Russian School in Antalya is a private international school in Antalya, Turkey. It opened on September 1, 2010. The school described itself as a Russian international school, but Mircelol Husanov, the Russian Consul General in Antalya, said that the school, which was using an American curriculum, will not be recognized by authorities as a Russian school because it did not offer a Russian curriculum. The Consulate of Russia in Antalya complained to Antalya education authorities about the school having the Russian flag, so the school took the flag down.

Student body
As of 2010 it had 70 students, all Russians or people from other parts of the former Soviet Union, attending elementary level classes.

See also
 Russians in Turkey

References

External links
 International Russian School in Antalya 

Russian international schools in Turkey
Education in Antalya
2010 establishments in Turkey
Educational institutions established in 2010